Stenotrophomonas humi is a nitrate-reducing, Gram-negative, rod-shaped and non-spore-forming bacterium from the genus of Stenotrophomonas which has been isolated from soil from Ghent in Belgium.

References 

Xanthomonadales
Bacteria described in 2007